Copelatus guerini is a species of diving beetle. It is part of the genus Copelatus in the subfamily Copelatinae of the family Dytiscidae. It was described by Aubé in 1838.

References

guerini
Beetles described in 1838